William Boats (1716-1794) was a Liverpool slave trader. Boats was responsible for 157 slave voyages, over half of his slaves were sent from the Bight of Biafra to Jamaica.

Slave trading and privateering

Boats had shares in at least 156 Guineaman. In the book History of the Liverpool Privateers the author wrote that Boats was a waif found in a boat and enrolled in a Blue Coat School. It claims that he was apprenticed to the sea and rose to be a commander of a slave ship, becoming "one of the leading merchants and shipowners of Liverpool". Continuing, it says he married Ms. Brideson and captured a Spanish ship rich in gold and treasure. A Liverpool paper which announced his death at the age of 78, called him a "most useful member of society".

Boats was the first slaver to have his ships sheathed in copper to prevent infestations of wood-boring parasites.

References

Sources
 

English slave traders
People from Liverpool
1716 births
1794 deaths
18th-century English businesspeople